The Skotterud derailment occurred on 1 October 2010, at Skotterud, Norway, when an InterCity train from Oslo (Norway) to Stockholm (Sweden) derailed due to a cracked wheel. Forty people, including former Eurovision Song Contest executive supervisor Jon Ola Sand, were reported injured. No one was killed in the derailment.

Accident 

Shortly after leaving Kongsvinger the train derailed near Skotterud at 17:40, with one carriage flipping over on its side and another running off the track and stopping in a ditch.

Passengers reported loud noises, sudden braking and a crash that some thought resulted from a collision with a vehicle. Most managed to get out of the wrecked carriages themselves and an emergency reception center was set up at the nearby town hall in Skotterud.

References 

2010 in Norway
Railway accidents in 2010
Derailments in Norway
2010 disasters in Norway